Bianca Allen is an American voice actress who primarily does narration voice-over work as well as characters in numerous video games. She is mostly known for her roles as Carrie Fernandez from Castlevania 64, Alicia S. Tiller and Misato Hayakawa from Countdown Vampires, and Reiko Hinomoto and Rowdy Reiko from Rumble Roses. Recently she has provided narration and subway platform announcements in Japanese.

Filmography

Television

Video games

References

External links

Bianca Allen on Giant Bomb

Living people
American expatriates in Japan
American video game actresses
American voice actresses
Place of birth missing (living people)
Year of birth missing (living people)
20th-century American actresses
21st-century American actresses